Mamusa Local Municipality is a local municipality in Dr Ruth Segomotsi Mompati District Municipality, North West Province, South Africa. The seat of local municipality is Schweizer-Reneke.

Politics

The municipal council consists of sixteen members elected by mixed-member proportional representation. Eight are elected by first-past-the-post voting in eight wards, while the remaining eight are chosen from party lists so that the total number of party representatives is proportional to the number of votes received. In the election of 1 November 2021 the African National Congress (ANC) won a majority of nine seats on the council.

The following table shows the results of the 2021 election.

As of 2023, Mamusa Local Municipality has received disclaimed audits (the worst outcome) for eleven years in a row, the only municipality to do so.

Geography
At the time of the 2011 census it has a population of 60,355. According to the census, the predominant language in the municipality is Setswana, spoken by 85.1% of the population, followed by Afrikaans (7.2%), Sesotho (2.2%) and English (1.7%). 91.5% of the population identified as "Black African", 5.5% as "White", 2.2% as "Coloured", and 0.5% as "Indian or Asian". The 2016 Community Survey estimated that the population had increased to 64,000.

The principal town is Schweizer-Reneke, located in the centre of the municipality, which (including the township of Ipelegeng) had a population of 41,226 in 2011. Other settlements include Amalia (pop. 5,481) to the west, and Migdol (pop. 3,526) and Glaudina (pop. 2,368) to the north-east.

Roads radiate outwards from Schweizer-Reneke towards Vryburg, Delareyville, Wolmaransstad, Bloemhof, Christiana and Pudimoe. The road from Vryburg to Bloemhof is designated as provincial route R34, while the others are designated as regional routes R504 (Pudimoe–Wolmaransstad) and R506 (Christiana–Delareyville). The Coligny–Vermaas–Pudimoe railway line also passes through the municipality.

References

External links 
 Official site

Local municipalities of the Dr Ruth Segomotsi Mompati District Municipality